Aryaman Sunil Uchil (born 30 April 2000) is a Singaporean cricketer. In August 2018, he was named in Singapore's squad for the 2018 Asia Cup Qualifier tournament. In September 2019, he was named in Singapore's squad for the 2019 Malaysia Cricket World Cup Challenge League A tournament. He made his List A debut for Singapore, against Qatar, in the Cricket World Cup Challenge League A tournament on 17 September 2019. Two days later, in the match against Demark, he took six wickets for 46 runs in his nine overs. He was the leading wicket-taker in the tournament, with fourteen dismissals in five matches.

Later in September 2019, he was named in Singapore's Twenty20 International (T20I) squad for the 2019–20 Singapore Tri-Nation Series. He made his T20I debut for Singapore, against Nepal, in the Singapore Tri-Nation Series on 28 September 2019. In October 2019, he was named in Singapore's squad for the 2019 ICC T20 World Cup Qualifier tournament in the United Arab Emirates.

References

External links
 

2000 births
Living people
Singaporean cricketers
Singapore Twenty20 International cricketers
Singaporean sportspeople of Indian descent